Jason Presson (born August 31, 1971) is a former American child actor, best known for his role of Darren in the 1985 movie Explorers, alongside Ethan Hawke and River Phoenix.

Career
His debut came in 1984 with the film The Stone Boy performing with Robert Duvall and Glenn Close. The following year, he was selected to play Darren Woods in Joe Dante's big budget movie, Explorers, with Ethan Hawke and River Phoenix. This movie was not a blockbuster, but earned nominations to the three protagonists at the Young Artist Award in the category for 'Best Young Actor'. The winner was his co-star and friend River Phoenix. Dante liked Presson's performance and subsequently cast him in a similar role in "The Shadow Man", a Twilight Zone segment which Dante directed.

In 1990, he had a minor role in the movie Gremlins 2: The New Batch, returning to work with the director Joe Dante after five years. His last role was on the TV series In the Heat of the Night as Jimmy Miller.

Filmography

References

External links
 Jason Presson at American Virus
 
 

1971 births
American male child actors
American male film actors
American male television actors
Living people